Chen Chih-ching (born 11 January 1952) is a Taiwanese politician. He was the Minister of Council of Agriculture in 2016. He was the Acting Magistrate of Nantou County from Deputy Magistrate position since 30 November 2012 until 25 December 2014 after incumbent Magistrate Lee Chao-ching was suspended from his post due to alleged corruption scandal.

Education
Chen received his bachelor's degree from Soochow University and master's degree from National Chung Hsing University in law.

Nantou County Magistracy

2014 Chinese New Year
During Chinese New Year celebration on 5 February 2014, Chen, accompanied by representative from Taiwan Provincial Government, Taiwan Provincial Consultative Council and Nantou County Government attended the celebration. He expressed his gratitude to colleagues in the county government for their contributions throughout the year and encouraged all of the departments to endeavor for the upcoming Lantern Festival.

References

Magistrates of Nantou County
Soochow University (Taiwan) alumni
National Chung Hsing University alumni
Living people
Taiwanese Ministers of Agriculture
1952 births